Martin Nikolai Røymark (born November 10, 1986) is a Norwegian professional ice hockey winger, currently playing for Vålerenga Ishockey of the Norwegian Get-ligaen (GET).

Playing career
On October 5, 2008, Røymark was invited to practice with Frölunda HC of the Elitserien for three days, pending further evaluation of him. On October 8, a press release said that he would return to his Norwegian team. However, it was decided that two parties would stay in touch.

In the 2009–10 Elitserien season, he played 55 matches for Frölunda, scoring five goals and having four assists. On April 12, Frölunda's General Manager, Kent Norberg, stated that they needed to reduce the number of forwards in the club. As a result, Røymark, Joakim Andersson, and Jens Karlsson was released from their contract, along with defenceman Janne Niskala.

Career statistics

Regular season and playoffs

International

References

External links

1986 births
Living people
Färjestad BK players
Frölunda HC players
Ice hockey players at the 2010 Winter Olympics
Ice hockey players at the 2014 Winter Olympics
Ice hockey players at the 2018 Winter Olympics
Manglerud Star Ishockey players
Modo Hockey players
Norwegian expatriate ice hockey people
Norwegian ice hockey forwards
Olympic ice hockey players of Norway
Sparta Warriors players
Ice hockey people from Oslo
Tappara players
Timrå IK players
Vålerenga Ishockey players